Habronattus ophrys is a species of spider from the family Salticidae found in the United States.

Description
The spider is black coloured, with orange middle.

References

Endemic fauna of the United States
Spiders of the United States
Salticidae
Spiders described in 1987